Alice Clary Earle Hyde (1876-1943) was an American botanical artist and conservationist.

Biography
Hyde née Earle was born in 1876 in Brooklyn, New York. She was the daughter of Henry Earle and the author Alice Morse Earle.

Hyde contributed to A guide to the wild flowers east of the Mississippi and north of Virginia, published in 1928. In 1936 Hyde organized an exhibit of Colonial Folk Arts and Customs Pertaining to Plants for the "National Committee on Folk Arts in the United States". In 1943 she contributed Spooky The Story of a Remarkable Ovenbird to the "Bulletin of North Carolina Bird Club" (now the Carolina Bird Club).

Hyde was the illustrator for an edition of Webster's Dictionary. She was a member of the New England Wildflower Society and served as vice president.

Hyde died on January 17, 1943, in Waterbury, Connecticut.

References

External links

1876 births
1943 deaths
People from Brooklyn
Botanical illustrators